The Finnish Rally Championship is the national rally championship in Finland. The series currently has four classes; Super4 (including R5, S2000 and old WRC cars), Production4 (including Group N cars), R2 (including R2 and R1 cars) and Super2 (including other 2WD cars apart from R2 and R1).

History
The series began in 1959 and featured four events; Hankiralli, 500-ralli, Syysralli and the 1000 Lakes Rally. Esko Keinänen and his co-driver Kai Nuortila took the title with a Peugeot 403. In 1970, Group 2 was introduced with Timo Mäkinen taking the first title. Group 4 championship was contested from 1976 to 1978. In the 1980s, Group A cars were allowed in Group 1, eventually replacing the older homologation entirely. Group 2 was replaced by Group N in 1987 and a new championship was created for Group B cars from 1983 to 1988. Group 4 entrants were allowed to participate in the Group B championship in 1983 and 1984. In the late 1980s, groups A and N were divided into over and under 2000 cc classes, creating the new groups "a" and "n". In addition to the usual classes, the Finnish Rally Championship for Ladies has been contested from 1971 to 1978 and from 1986 to 2000.

Champions

References

External links

Ralli SM

Auto racing series in Finland
Rally racing series
Rally
Recurring sporting events established in 1959
1959 establishments in Finland